Biochemical and Biophysical Research Communications is a weekly peer-reviewed scientific journal covering all aspects of biochemistry and biophysics. It was established in 1959 by Academic Press and is currently published by Elsevier. The editor-in-chief is Wolfgang Baumeister (Max Planck Institute of Biochemistry).

According to the Journal Citation Reports, the journal has a 2020 impact factor of 3.575.

Abstracting and indexing 
The journal is abstracted and indexed in:

References

External links 
 

Elsevier academic journals
Publications established in 1959
Biochemistry journals
Biophysics journals
English-language journals
Weekly journals